Atahualpa Canton is a canton of Ecuador, located in the El Oro Province.  Its capital is the town of Paccha.  Its population at the 2001 census was 5,479.

Demographics
Ethnic groups as of the Ecuadorian census of 2010:
Mestizo  85.3%
Montubio  7.2%
White  6.0%
Afro-Ecuadorian  1.3%
Indigenous  0.1%
Other  0.1%

References

Cantons of El Oro Province